The year 1783 in science and technology involved some significant events:

Astronomy

 February 26 – Caroline Herschel discovers NGC 2360.
 May – John Goodricke presents his conclusions that the variable star Algol is what comes to be known as an eclipsing binary to the Royal Society of London.
 August 18 – Great Meteor passes over Great Britain, exciting scientific interest.
 November 27 – John Michell proposes the existence of black holes ("dark stars").
 Jérôme Lalande publishes a revised edition of John Flamsteed’s star catalogue in an ephemeris, Éphémérides des mouvemens célestes, numbering the stars consecutively by constellation, the system which becomes known as "Flamsteed designations".

Aviation
 June 5 – The Montgolfier brothers send up at Annonay, near Lyon, a 900 m linen hot air balloon as a public demonstration. Its flight covers 2 km and lasts 10 minutes, to an estimated altitude of 1600–2000 metres.
 August 27 – Jacques Charles and the Robert brothers launch the first hydrogen balloon in Paris.
 November 21 – The first free flight by humans in a balloon is made by Pilâtre de Rozier and Marquis d'Arlandes who fly aloft for 25 minutes about 100 metres above Paris for a distance of 9 km.
 December 26 – Louis-Sébastien Lenormand makes the first ever recorded public demonstration of a parachute descent by jumping from the tower of the Montpellier observatory in France using his rigid-framed model which he intends as a form of fire escape.

Botany
 Jean Baptiste François Pierre Bulliard publishes his Dictionnaire Elémentaire de Botanique, contributing to the spread of Linnaean terminology, particularly in mycology.
 Erasmus Darwin begins publication of A System of Vegetables, a translation of Linnaeus in which he coins many common English language names of plants.

Chemistry
 Antoine Lavoisier publishes Réflexions sur le phlogistique, showing the phlogiston theory to be inconsistent, proposing chemical reaction as an alternative theory in a paper read to the French Academy of Sciences in June, names hydrogen and demonstrates that water is a compound and not an element.
 Discovery of tungsten –  José and Fausto Elhuyar find an acid in wolframite which they reduce with charcoal to isolate tungsten.

Earth sciences
 February 5–March 28 – Calabrian earthquakes in Kingdom of Two Sicilies.
 June 8 – The volcano Laki in Iceland begins a major eruption with extensive climatic consequences on both sides of the Atlantic Ocean.
 August 4 (Edo period, Tenmei 3) – Mount Asama, the most active volcano in Japan, begins climactic eruption, exacerbating a famine, following a plinian eruption beginning on May 9 (Tenmei eruption).

History of science and technology
 German physician Melchior Adam Weikard publishes a biography of microscopist Wilhelm Friedrich von Gleichen, Biographie des Herrn Wilhelm Friedrich v. Gleichen genannt Rußwurm.

Physics
 Jean-Paul Marat publishes Mémoire sur l'électricité médicale ("Memorandum on Medical Electricity").

Technology
 Henry Cort of Funtley, England, invents the grooved rolling mill for producing bar iron.
 Thomas Bell patents a method of printing on fabric from engraved cylinders.
 Horace-Bénédict de Saussure publishes Essai sur l'hygrométrie, recording his experiments with the hair hygrometer.

Awards
 Copley Medal: John Goodricke; Thomas Hutchins

Births
 May 22 – William Sturgeon, English inventor (died 1850)
 June 9 – Benjamin Collins Brodie, English physiologist (died 1862)
 October 6 – François Magendie, French physiologist (died 1855)
 October 22 – Constantine Samuel Rafinesque, Ottoman-born French American polymath (died 1840)
 October 31 – Karl Wilhelm Gottlob Kastner, German chemist (died 1857)
 December 18 – Mary Anne Whitby, English scientist (died 1850)

Deaths
 March 30 – William Hunter, Scottish anatomist (born 1718)
 April 16 – Christian Mayer, Moravian astronomer (born 1719)
 September 18 – Leonhard Euler, Swiss mathematician and physicist (born 1707)
 October 29 – Jean le Rond d'Alembert, French mathematician and physicist (born 1717)
 November – Carl Linnaeus the Younger, Swedish naturalist (born 1741 )
 December 13 – Pehr Wilhelm Wargentin, Swedish astronomer (born 1717)
 December 16 – Arima Yoriyuki, Japanese mathematician (born 1714)
 Wilhelm Friedrich von Gleichen, German microscopist (born 1717)

References

 
18th century in science
1780s in science